Zemledelets is a rural locality (a settlement) in Sevsky District, Bryansk Oblast, Russia. The population was 18 as of 2010. There is 1 street.

Geography 
Zemledelets is located 15 km east of Sevsk (the district's administrative centre) by road. Krivtsovka is the nearest rural locality.

References 

Rural localities in Sevsky District